Funminiyi Afuye (11 July 1956 – 19 October 2022) was a Nigerian politician and lawyer. He was the commissioner of Ekiti State Ministry of Information and a two-time member of the Ekiti State Assembly representing Ikere constituency I.

Political offices 

Funminiyi Afuye was a member of the third assembly between 2007 and 2011.  From 2011–2014, he was a Commissioner for two different ministries; Ekiti State Ministry of Information and Ministry of Integration and Intergovernmental Affairs during the era of Governor Kayode Fayemi.He was re elected in the sixth assembly and he became the speaker of the house on 6 June 2019.

References 

1956 births
2022 deaths
Speakers of the Ekiti State House of Assembly
Members of the Ekiti State House of Assembly
Ekiti State politicians
21st-century Nigerian politicians
People from Ekiti State